Byrana Nagappa Suresh (born 12 November 1943) is an Indian aerospace scientist. He is presently the Chancellor, Indian Institute of Space Science and Technology (IIST) at Thiruvananthapuram and Honorary Distinguished Professor at ISRO HQ. He was President Indian National Academy of Engineering, INAE at Delhi, for four years during 2015 to 2018. He served as the Director of Vikram Sarabhai Space Centre (VSSC), Thiruvananthapuram during the period 2003–2007. He is known for his contribution to the development of Indian launch vehicles, Space Capsule Recovery Experiments (SRE) and also for R& D management. Suresh also served as the founding director of Indian Institute of Space Science and Technology (IIST), Thiruvananthapuram. He retired from IIST in November 2010. He was Vikram Sarabhai Distinguished Professor at ISRO HQ for 5 years since November 2010 and also a professor at IIT, Mumbai and MIT, Manipal for 3 years. He was a member of the board of governors (BOG) for IIT, Madras for 7 years until July 2018. He is the vice chair for the Design Division of Aeronautical Society of India. He is one of the associate editors of the book From Fishing Hamlet To Red Planet and a co-author of Ever Upwards: ISRO in Images, both tracing the history of Indian Space Research Organisation.
He is the President of the reputed Jnanadeepa Senior Secondary School and Sri Aurobindo Foundation for Education (Shivamogga, Karnataka)

Suresh is a recipient of the Indian civilian honors, Padma Bhushan and Padma Shri which he received in 2013 and 2002 respectively. He has also received the Aryabhata Award” from the Astronautical society of India in 2009, besides several other awards.

Early life and education
Suresh's father was an agriculturist in Hosakere, Andagar, a small village near Koppa town situated near Sringeri in Karnataka, India. He attended his entire schooling in Andagar and Koppa and studied in Kannada medium. After his bachelor's degree in science in 1963 and engineering in 1967 from Mysore University, he took his master's degree in mechanical engineering from Indian Institute of Technology Madras in 1969. He did his doctorate in control systems from Salford University, United Kingdom, in 1978.

Selected Bibliography

Articles

Books

References

External links
ISRO News
cmmacs
INAE profile
 

IIT Madras alumni
Indian Space Research Organisation people
Recipients of the Padma Shri in science & engineering
Alumni of the University of Salford
Scientists from Thiruvananthapuram
Living people
Indian aerospace engineers
1943 births
University of Mysore alumni
Recipients of the Padma Bhushan in science & engineering
Engineers from Karnataka
People from Belagavi district
20th-century Indian engineers
Recipients of the Rajyotsava Award 2014
https://www.incose.org/events-and-news/incose-and-se-news/2018/08/06/incose-recognizes-dr-b-n-suresh-(isro)-with-pioneer-award